Anthony Wilbur White (born 20 November 1938) is a former West Indian cricketer who played in two Test matches in 1965.

Tony White was a middle-order batsman and off-spinner who played for Barbados from 1958 to 1965–66. He toured England with the West Indian team in 1963 without playing in the Tests, joining the side midway through the tour as a back-up for the injured Willie Rodriguez.

He played his two Tests against the Australians in 1964–65. In the First Test he top-scored with 57 not out in the first innings, after coming in with the score at 149 for 6 and taking the total to 239 all out. He also took three cheap wickets in a 179-run victory. But he failed to take a wicket off 52 overs in the drawn Second Test, scored only 7 and 4, and was replaced by Seymour Nurse for the Third Test.

His best first-class bowling figures were 6 for 80 against Trinidad in 1960–61. His highest score was 75 against British Guiana in the final of the Pentangular Tournament in 1961–62, when he also scored 54 in the second innings and took four wickets in a losing cause.

He lives in Venezuela.

References

External links 

1938 births
Living people
West Indies Test cricketers
Barbadian cricketers
Barbados cricketers